This is a list of the number-one singles of the Polish Dance Club Singles Chart.

List of number-one dance singles

See also
 Polish music charts
 List of number-one singles in Poland
 List of number-one albums in Poland

External links
 Official Dance Singles Chart Top 50 at ZPAV
 Polish Dance Chart - archive 
 Dj top 50 polish dance chart at DJPromotion

Polish record charts